The 2010 CONCACAF Champions League Final was a two-legged football match-up to determine the 2009–10 CONCACAF Champions League champions. Pachuca won the title with a 1-0 home win against compatriots Cruz Azul in the second leg of the final.

This was the fourth all-Mexican CONCACAF club championship final in the last five years, and the second in a row.

Rules 
Like other match-ups in the knockout round, the teams played two games, one at each team's home stadium. If the teams remained tied after 90 minutes of play during the 2nd leg, the away goals rule would be used, but not after a tie enters extra time, and so a tie would be decided by penalty shootout if the aggregate score is level after extra time.

Road to Final

Final summary

First leg

Second leg

References

External links

Final
2009–10 in Mexican football
C.F. Pachuca matches
Cruz Azul matches
International club association football competitions hosted by Mexico
CONCACAF Champions League finals
April 2010 sports events in North America